Geofilum is a genus of bacteria from the family of Marinilabiliaceae.

References

Bacteria genera
Bacteroidia